The  Speaker of the Ondo State House of Assembly is the political head of the Ondo State House of Assembly, elected by the Members of the Assembly.
The incumbent Speaker is Bamidele Oleyelogun who  succeeded the former speaker Jumoke Akindele following change of the leadership of the house.

Powers and duties
The speaker's statutory duty is to preside over the sitting and deliberations of the Assembly but the Deputy Speaker can preside in the absence of the Speaker. 
The Speaker also represents the voters of his or her constituency.

See also
Ondo State Government House

References

1976 establishments in Nigeria
State lower houses in Nigeria